Vinodol is a municipality in the Primorje-Gorski Kotar County in western Croatia.

The total population of the municipality is 3,577 people, in the following settlements:
 Bribir, population 1,695
 Drivenik, population 308
 Grižane-Belgrad, population 953
 Tribalj, population 621

The population is 93.4% Croats.

The Law codex of Vinodol, a medieval Croatian codex, was made in and named after this region. The Vinodol Hydroelectric Power Plant is located in the region. The Vinodol Channel is the part of the Adriatic Sea to the south of the region.

Notable people
Notable people that were born or lived in Vinodol include:
Juraj Juričić (?–1578), Croatian-Slovenian Protestant preacher and translator
Julije Klović or Giulio Clovio (1498-1578), Croatian illuminator miniaturist painter considered the greatest illuminator of Italian high renaissance period

See also
 Geography of Croatia
 Karlići

References

Municipalities of Croatia
Populated places in Primorje-Gorski Kotar County